The 1999 Tour de France was the 86th edition of Tour de France, one of cycling's Grand Tours. The Tour began in Le Puy du Fou with a prologue individual time trial on 3 July and Stage 11 occurred on 15 July with a hilly stage from Le Bourg-d'Oisans. The race finished on the Champs-Élysées in Paris on 25 July.

Stage 11
15 July 1999 — Le Bourg-d'Oisans to Saint-Étienne,

Stage 12
16 July 1999 — Saint-Galmier to Saint-Flour,

Stage 13
17 July 1999 — Saint-Flour to Albi,

Stage 14
18 July 1999 — Castres to Saint-Gaudens,

Stage 15

Stage 16
21 July 1999 — Lannemezan to Pau,

Stage 17
22 July 1999 — Mourenx to Bordeaux,

Stage 18
23 July 1999 — Jonzac to Futuroscope,

Stage 19
24 July 1999 — Futuroscope,  (ITT)

Stage 20
25 July 1999 — Arpajon to Paris Champs-Élysées,

References

1999 Tour de France
Tour de France stages